Deer School District was a school district headquartered in Deer, Arkansas.

Its sole school was the Deer School, divided into primary and secondary divisions.

On July 1, 2004, it consolidated with the Mount Judea School District to form the Deer/Mount Judea School District.

References

Further reading
 (Download) - Includes a map of the Deer School District

External links

Education in Newton County, Arkansas
2004 disestablishments in Arkansas
School districts disestablished in 2004
Defunct school districts in Arkansas